Platinum Arena Khabarovsk is an indoor arena located in Khabarovsk, the capital of Khabarovsk Krai in eastern Russia. The arena was opened in 2003 and has a capacity of 7,100.  It is the home arena of the ice hockey team Amur Khabarovsk of the Kontinental Hockey League, and the former home of the Golden Amur hockey team of the Asia League Ice Hockey.

External links 
 

Indoor ice hockey venues in Russia
Indoor arenas in Russia
Music venues in Russia
Amur Khabarovsk
Buildings and structures in Khabarovsk Krai
Kontinental Hockey League venues